
Year 119 BC was a year of the pre-Julian Roman calendar. At the time it was known as the Year of the Consulship of Dalmaticus and Cotta (or, less frequently, year 635 Ab urbe condita) and the Fourth Year of Yuanshou. The denomination 119 BC for this year has been used since the early medieval period, when the Anno Domini calendar era became the prevalent method in Europe for naming years.

Events 
 By place 

 Roman Republic 
 The second Dalmatian war begins.

 China 
 Spring: Han Chinese forces under the General-in-Chief Wei Qing and the cavalry general Huo Qubing invade the Xiongnu Empire.
Battle of Mobei: Wei Qing crosses the Gobi Desert, defeats Yizhixie Chanyu and kills or captures 19,000 Xiongnu.
Huo Qubing crosses the eastern Gobi, defeats and executes Bijuqi, defeats the Tuqi (Worthy Prince) of the Left (East), and captures three kings. He reaches as far as Lake Baikal.
 Failing to reconnoiter with Wei Qing's army, general Li Guang commits suicide after learning that Wei has prepared charges against him.
 Emperor Wu creates the rank of Grand Marshal and gives it to both Wei Qing and Huo Qubing, thereby making Huo's rank and salary equal to that of Wei.
 Emperor Wu suspends further campaigning against the Xiongnu due to a shortage of horses. 
 Government monopolies are established in iron, salt and liquor.

Births

Deaths 
 Di Shan, Chinese politician of the Han Dynasty
 Li Guang, Chinese general of the Han Dynasty

References